Worbla is a brand of thermoplastic modelling materials, popular among cosplayers for creating costumes, armor and props.
The name of the material is that of Worbla AG, a former synthetics manufacturer in Worblaufen, Switzerland, now part of the Gurit group. The material is marketed by the German company Cast4Art Vertriebsgesellschaft.

Use
It is then draped over formers or hand-moulded (wearing gloves) to shape. The inbuilt adhesive allows multiple layers to be laminated easily, for either strength or to add bas relief detail. A common technique for wearable props such as armour is to laminate it to thin EVA foam sheet, giving a light and slightly flexible carapace.

Worbla can also be moulded, when warmed, as a putty and used to sculpt solid pieces. Unusually, offcuts of sheet can be recycled in this way. The material can be cut with scissors, knives or by laser. When cold it can be cut, carved or sanded with woodworking hand tools. The surface is slightly rough, similar to some grades of leather, which allows textured paint effects. For a smooth surface it can be either sanded or filled with a primer paint.

Cosplayers and prop makers have widely adopted Worbla for its light weight, and easy working with minimal tools.

Varieties and properties
Worbla is made in several varieties:
Finest Art: The original "Worbla", a sheet material composed of a thermoplastic resin and wood flour filler. The sheet is coated on one side with a heat-activated adhesive. 
Flame Red Art: Similar to the original, but with a flame retardant component, for "locations where safety is of the utmost importance".
Black: This product has a smoother surface, similar to EVA foam, and is designed to be painted with less filling and sanding needed. It is also workable at 90 °C.

Worbla’s® KobraCast Art: which initially resembles knitted plastic sheeting, is heat activated (approx. 80-90 °C / 175-195 °F) and can be shaped by hand, in a mold, or vacuformed. KobraCast Art contains a very strong adhesive, with a very stretchable, but tear-resistant mesh inside. Named after Kobracast see below.

Similar materials 
 Kobracast (called KOBRA CAST 445 in the health care industry), a thermoplastic and fabric mesh bandage from the German company KOB - Karl Otto Braun GmbH & Co. KG. Worked warm like Worbla, this is strong and flexible owing to the fabric mesh reinforcement, but does not offer the solid surface. Made of flexible PES fabric.
 Poli® Plastics Polymorph and 42°C Poli® Mouldable Pellets (Friendly Plastic / Coolmorph), 3mm PCL Polycaprolactone thermoplastic beads, made in the United Kingdom, that are mouldable at 62°C for SuperMorph or 42°C for Coolmorph.
 Cosplayflex, a thermoplastic material from Germany.
 Sintra, more durable and stiffer
 Kydex, a robust thermoplastic, less commonly used for props, but often for firearm holsters, and sheaths for knives.

References

Thermoplastics
Cosplay